Speculations regarding the health of Vladimir Putin have been a regular occurrence since his rise to power, and include conjecture about severe medical issues, his imminent death, and on occasion reports about Putin having passed away already. This has been compared to Kremlinology, the Cold War-era study of the political ongoings in the Soviet government, which included assumptions about internal Soviet politics based on details about public appearances of Soviet leaders and other titbits.

Background

For approximately 20 years, multiple sources have regularly reported that the president of Russia Vladimir Putin is weeks or months away from death or medical incapacity. At various points, it has been rumored that he is suffering from terminal thyroid cancer, blood cancer, abdominal cancer, Parkinson's disease, leprosy, serious surgery complications, the aftereffects of a stroke, or that he is, in fact, already dead.

According to the New Statesman, many such allegations are based on "the old Soviet-era practice of Kremlinology, in which analysts scrutinise the leader's public appearances for signs of physical decline and clues as to who might be in favour or out, in the absence of reliable information". According to a 2004 UPI report, Kremlinology was a "speculative pseudo-science" that was never very successful in its predictive power; The New York Times C.L. Sulzberger described it as an "occult pseudoscience". The Christian Science Monitors Russia correspondent Fred Weir has also described Kremlinology, and its use of analysis of photographs and public schedules, as a "pseudo-science".

Selected reports

2005 report of stroke 
In 2005, The Atlantic published an essay, based on observation of film footage, alleging Putin had suffered a stroke and was dying.

2014 report of terminal pancreatic cancer 
In 2014, the New York Post reported Putin was dying of pancreatic cancer. Russian government spokesman Dmitri Peskov denied the report and, as of 2023, Putin is still alive.

2015 report of serious surgery complications 
In 2015, mainstream media outlets in the United States reported that Vladimir Putin might be seriously ill due to complications from a secret cosmetic surgery procedure it was claimed he'd undergone. The rumors originated after the Russian president postponed a scheduled meeting from 11 to 18 March, as well as analysis of background objects in official photographs by Russia observers.  

Vox reported that "the idea that Putin would schedule plastic surgery for a week when he was supposed to have multiple public meetings seems highly implausible" and Russian government spokesman Dmitri Peskov denied Putin was suffering any type of medical issues. Asked to comment on the report Putin was dying of surgery complications, the Brookings Institution's Hannah Thoburn said "for all we know, he probably has the flu, or just wanted to hang out with his daughters or something". Russian television later aired footage of Putin attending a separate meeting on 13 March.

2015 report of actual death 
Later in 2015, reports circulated on social media that Putin had died, including some reports that Putin had died on purpose so he could distract public attention from domestic issues. Asked if Putin was dead, Kremlin spokesman Dmitry Peskov denied the reports, affirming Putin was alive and adding "we've already said this a hundred times".

2017 and 2020 reports of leprosy and Parkinson's disease
In 2017, Valery Solovei asserted Vladimir Putin was about to resign for health-related reasons. Putin did not resign. In 2020, Solovei and others variously claimed that Putin had cancer, Parkinson's disease or leprosy and would imminently resign, a claim which also did not transpire.

2022 report of multiple "serious illnesses"
In May 2022, Ukrainian military intelligence chief Kyrylo Budanov reported that Vladimir Putin was simultaneously suffering from "several serious illnesses, one of which is cancer". Christopher Steele also alleged Putin was "dying".

The New Statesman reported there was "no verifiable evidence that Putin is seriously ill"; Russian foreign minister Sergei Lavrov denied the allegation; William Burns, the director of the United States Central Intelligence Agency said "as far as we can tell, he's entirely too healthy"; and Richard Moore, the head of MI6 said there "is no evidence that Putin is suffering from serious illness".

2022 report of actual death
On 28 May 2022 the Daily Star reported that Putin may have died of blood cancer. The Sunday Mirror published its own story the next day also reporting that Putin may have been dead. 

On 7 July 2022, the Washington Post reported that Putin met with Indonesian president Joko Widodo on 30 June; the story was published with a photograph from a Getty Images contributor that showed the two men shaking hands. On 20 July 2022, Reuters reported Putin met that day in Tehran with Turkish president Tayyip Erdogan  in an encounter witnessed by journalists. On 31 July 2022, Putin delivered a public speech during Navy Day festivities in Saint Petersburg.

2022 reports of hemiplegia
In July 2022, the Toronto Sun and other media outlets reported Putin had lost use of his right arm due to an unexplained medical crisis. The Toronto Sun cited, as evidence of the allegation, that a video showed Putin swatting a mosquito with his left arm instead of his right.

Neurologists have previously noted that several Russian officials such as Anatoly Sidorov and Sergei Ivanov who, like Putin, have specialized training by Soviet-era military and intelligence services typically make limited use of their right arm, often holding it unnaturally stiff to the side of the torso in what is called "gunslinger's gait". A 2015 study by Dutch physicians published in the British Medical Journal which compared video of the various officials against body movement instructions in a KGB training manual, suggested this was a learned behavioral adaptation to allow quick access to a firearm in response to a sudden threat and probably not a signifier of any medical condition in either Putin or other Russian political leaders.

Notes

See also
 List of federal subjects of Russia by life expectancy
 List of premature obituaries
 Paul is dead
 Predictions of the collapse of the Soviet Union

References

Vladimir Putin
Putin
Putin